The Omaka River is a river of the Marlborough Region of New Zealand's South Island.

The New Zealand Ministry for Culture and Heritage gives a translation of "place of the stream" for Ōmaka.

See also
List of rivers of New Zealand

References

Rivers of the Marlborough Region
Rivers of New Zealand